WBC Slavia Sofia is a Bulgarian women's basketball section of the Slavia Sofia sport society. Men's basketball team of Slavia Sofia is not active.

Slavia Sofia was an early powerhouse of Bulgarian women's basketball, winning 12 national championships between 1953 and 1965. In 1959 it won the inaugural edition of the European Cup beating Dynamo Moscow, and in 1965 it won its second title, becoming the only team to knock out Daugava Riga in the competition between 1960 and 1975. It also reached the finals in 1960 and 1965. However, since 1965 the team has not won any additional championships. Its major international success in subsequent years was reaching the Ronchetti Cup's semifinals in 1980.

Slavia briefly returned to the national elite in the first half of the 2000s, winning three national championships between 2002 and 2004, and appearing in the new FIBA Eurocup.  However, it subsequently declined. As of the end of 2011-2012 season it is last in the national championship, losing quarterfinal playoff series against ex-champion Neftochimik with 2:1.

Slavia has won a record 33 honours: 3 NBL titles and 2 Bulgarian Cups/Men/ & 15 Bulgarian championships, 11 Bulgarian Cups and 2 European Cups/Women/. International titles won by the club are: 2 EuroLeague Women in 1939 & 1963.

Honours

Men
National Basketball League
Winners (3): 1952, 1953, 1997
Bulgarian Cup
Winners: (2) 1959, 1997

Women
 European Cups: (2) 1959, 1963
 Runners-up (2): 1960, 1965
 Bulgarian Leagues (15): 1953, 1954, 1955, 1956, 1957, 1958, 1959, 1961, 1962, 1963, 1964, 1965, 2002, 2003, 2004
 Runners-up (9): 1945, 1952, 1960, 1966, 1968, 1971, 1992, 1999, 2000
 Bulgarian Cups (11): 1952, 1953, 1955, 1956, 1966, 1970, 1971, 1992, 2000, 2001, 2003
 Runners-up (5): 1954, 1975,1992, 2000, 2002

References

Women's basketball teams in Bulgaria
EuroLeague Women clubs
Basketball
Basketball teams established in 1913
1913 establishments in Bulgaria